Broadway to Hollywood is a 1933 American pre-Code musical film directed by Willard Mack, produced by Harry Rapf, cinematography by Norbert Brodine and released by Metro-Goldwyn-Mayer. The film features many of MGM's stars of the time, including Frank Morgan, Alice Brady, May Robson, Madge Evans, Jimmy Durante, Mickey Rooney, and Jackie Cooper. Brothers Moe Howard and Curly Howard of The Three Stooges appear—without Ted Healy and without Larry Fine—almost unrecognizably, as Otto and Fritz, two clowns in makeup. It was the first film to feature Nelson Eddy.

Plot
Ted and Lulu Hackett are vaudeville's The Hacketts, a fairly successful song-and-dance team. They bring their son Ted Jr. up in the business and he soon eclipses them. When the son is offered a starring role on Broadway, he arranges for his parents to join him in the show, but Ted Sr. is embarrassed to learn that he and Lulu are there purely in order to keep their son happy. They return to vaudeville, only to find that their duet act has gone stale with time. Meanwhile, Ted Jr. has married and had a son, but he has also fallen victim to drink. Tragedy strikes the Hackett family, and only the march of time will tell whether Ted III will repeat the failings of his father and grandfather.

Cast
 Alice Brady as Lulu Hackett
 Frank Morgan as Ted Hackett
 Jackie Cooper as Ted Hackett Jr. as a Child
 Russell Hardie as Ted Hackett Jr.
 Madge Evans as Anne Ainsley
 Mickey Rooney as Ted Hackett III as a Child
 Eddie Quillan as Ted Hackett III
 Jimmy Durante as Jimmy
 May Robson as Veteran Actress
 Albertina Rasch Dancers as Themselves
 Fay Templeton as herself

Preservation
The film features several sequences taken from the unfinished MGM musical The March of Time (1930), including some filmed in the early two-color Technicolor process. Fay Templeton, DeWolf Hopper Sr., and Albertina Rasch and her dancers are featured in footage taken from The March of Time. However, current prints of Broadway to Hollywood as shown on Turner Classic Movies have no color sequences. The film was released on September 15, 1933, by Metro-Goldwyn-Mayer.

See also
 Three Stooges Filmography

References

External links

 
 
 
 

1933 films
1933 musical films
American black-and-white films
American musical films
Films produced by Harry Rapf
Metro-Goldwyn-Mayer films
Films with screenplays by Edgar Allan Woolf
Films directed by Willard Mack
1930s English-language films
1930s American films